Park Hee-young ( or  ; born 21 March 1991) is a South Korean women's football midfielder who plays for Hyundai Steel Red Angels.

International goals

References

External links
 

1991 births
Living people
South Korean women's footballers
South Korea women's under-17 international footballers
South Korea women's under-20 international footballers
South Korea women's international footballers
Women's association football midfielders
2015 FIFA Women's World Cup players
Asian Games medalists in football
Footballers at the 2014 Asian Games
Asian Games bronze medalists for South Korea
Medalists at the 2014 Asian Games
WK League players
Incheon Hyundai Steel Red Angels WFC players